Raymond Wadih Audi (October 1932 – 15 July 2022) was a Lebanese banker, politician and businessman. He was the co-founder of Bank Audi.

Career
Raymond Wadih Audi was born on 6 October 1932 in Sidon, Lebanon. His father was a banker and his mother a painter, the family banking business go back to his great-grandfather who had founded a house exchange in Sidon in 1850. Raymond completed a two-year internship at Banque Misr Liban, then he moved to Kuwait. In cooperation with his family, he founded Bank Audi in Lebanon in 1962, followed by opening two branches in Europe in the 1970s. He was the director of the bank since its founding and the chairman since 1998. He was also the chairman of the bank's Corporate Goveranance and Remuneration Committee. He stepped down from his position as chairman in 2017 and was succeeded by Samir Hanna.

Raymond Audi served in the Lebanese government as Minister of the Displaced from 11 July 2008 to 9 November 2009.

He established the Audi Foundation, which is dedicated to the promotion and preservation of traditional craftsmanship in Lebanon.

Awards 
Audi was elected the president of the Association of Banks of Lebanon in 1993. He has received awards, among them, the Euromoney's Lifetime Achievement Award, and an honorary doctorate from the Lebanese American University.

Death 

He died on 15 July 2022, at the age of 90.

Personal life 
Audi was married and had two sons and a daughter: Pierre, Paul, and Sherine.

His brother, Paul Audi, is a writer and philosopher.

References

1932 births
2022 deaths
People from Sidon
Lebanese Melkite Greek Catholics
Lebanese businesspeople
Lebanese bankers
Chevaliers of the Légion d'honneur
Officers of the National Order of the Cedar
Knights of St. Gregory the Great
Order of Civil Merit members